The Hebrew Scouts Movement in Israel (Tnuat HaTzofim HaIvriyim BeYisrael) is an Israeli Jewish co-ed Scouting and Guiding association with about 80,000 members. The Hebrew Scouts Movement is now the largest youth movement in Israel

It is a member of the Israel Boy and Girl Scouts Federation, which is a member of the World Organization of the Scout Movement (WOSM) and the World Association of Girl Guides and Girl Scouts (WAGGGS).

Established in 1919, the Tzofim (Hebrew Scouts Movement) was the first Zionist youth movement in Israel and remains today the largest "National Youth Movement" in the country. Tzofim is famously known as the first egalitarian scouting movement in the world, where boys and girls participate together on an equal basis.

History

Establishment 

The organization was established during Passover of 1919 by some youth and sports associations, including the "Meshotetim" association and the "Herzliya" association that held activities in the format of the founder of world scouting, Baden-Powell. As the head of the movement elected Zvi Nishri. The connection between the associations was loose if at all and it was not yet a fully consolidated movement in every sense of the word.

The first Scout tribe, "Meshotetei BaCarmel" in the Hadar neighborhood of Haifa, was established in 1925 by the Haifa's Reali School. It was initiated by a teacher – Aryeh Croch (who later stood for many years at the head of the Hebrew Scouts Movement).

In 1939, the religious Scouts, named "Adat HaTzofim" joined to the Hebrew Scout Movement with the leadership of Asher Rivlin as the head of Jewish religious scouting in Israel.

In the 1940's the movement sent the best scouting graduates to the Palmach. During that time the center of the movement was in the north of the country and the Palmach recruits were trained on the "Reali" school ground before joining to the organization. The Hebrew Scout Movement in Israel also sent its graduates across the country to create Jewish settlements and Hebrew labor, as part of the establishment of the new Jewish state.

1950s split 
In 1951, during the split of HaKibbutz HaMeuhad there was also a split in the Hebrew Scouts Movement. Most members of the movement wanted to preserve its democratic and non-partisan character.

At the Movement's Council, which met in October 1950, it was decided to add to the Hebrew Scouts Movement principles in opposition to totalitarian regimes (communism, fascism). Following this decision, supporters of Mapam, who supported communism, broke away from the movement, and created in May 1951, the "Pioneering Scout movement" who joined after a short time the "HaMahanot HaOlim" youth movement, that was also associated with KM and Mapam.

The Hebrew Scouts Movement remained in contact with the United Kibbutz Movement, which was informally identified with Mapai, and not with the communist ideology.

Today 

Today the Hebrew Scouts Movement has over 85,000 members from the ages of 9 to 18 years old in about 205 scout tribes; it is the largest youth movement in Israel (as of 2013).

The movement is divided into 15 regional leaderships operating relatively autonomously, but subject to the provisions and procedures of the movement. The "Tzabar" Scouts for Israeli children living abroad, which operates in the United States, Canada, Australia, Hong Kong, Netherlands, United Kingdom and the former Soviet Union, have separate managements and activities, but the same values and principles.

Regions of the Hebrew Scouts Movement in Israel:
 Tzafon region (North)
 Haifa region
 HaTzuk region
 hahoresh region
 HaShahar region
 Dror region
 Menashe region
 Dan region
 Ramat-Gan region
 Tel Aviv-Yafo region
 Ayalon region
 HaHof region
 Jerusalem region
 Yehuda region
 Sorek region
 Darom region (South)
Some of the regions incorporate a large area (the South region – from Kiryat Gat to Yeruham) and some regions include only one big city (the Tel-Aviv-Yafo region). In addition to the regions there are also various segments of scout tribes, such as the SHVA Scouts (for Ethiopian immigrants), Sea Scouts, and Adat HaTzofim, a religious division which was once a separate organization.

Every region has both professionals and volunteers working for it, and has offices, vehicles, equipment, financial plan, events, camps, trips and more.

Tzabar Scouts 
Tzabar Scouts is the name for the Hebrew Scouts regions located outside Israel, in the United States, Canada, Australia, Hong Kong, Netherlands, United Kingdom and the former Soviet Union. It aims to foster Zionism and love of Israel among Israelis who live in these countries. Activities are held in Hebrew, and the members work in similar settings to the Scouts in Israel, and pass the rest of courses and seminars on topics such as identity and culture. Under the existing backlog Scouts 56 tribes that meet on a weekly basis. Tzabar is an active educational framework for Israelis to strengthen Jewish identity and Israeli-Zionist, maintaining contact with the Israeli-Zionist culture and the State of Israel, and providing tools for members of the graduating addressing the issue of their return.

Age groups 

Each age group has its own name in the Hebrew Scouts movement. During the year there is a celebration in which members of every age-group pass a test according to their age, and after passing the test members are given the new rank they have earned (rank is a scout-scarf in different colors).

*From the age of 15–16 years, the scout-scarf changes according to the member's role in the scout tribe.

Organizational structure 
Organizationally, it is possible to divide the Hebrew Scouts Movement in the following way:
 The National Leadership is the head of the Hebrew Scouts Movement in Israel. The chairman of the national leadership is also the chairman of the Hebrew Scouts Movement in Israel. As of this period, it is Eli Ben-Yosef.
 On the movement management in charge the Secretary-General.
 Departments and Divisions:
 Department of Finance
 Department of Marketing and Public Relations
 Education Division
 All scout regions in Israel
 Program Department
 Israel Scouts Website
 Israel National Scouting Center
 Department for Special Needs
 Department for Immigrant Absorption
 Department of "the next way" – which is responsible for the formulation and management of tens of different scouting volunteer programs for scouts aged 18 to 19 years old, and some special army-programs for scouts who continue being scouts during their compulsory army service.
 Safety Department
 Department for Youth at Risk
 Sea Scouts Sector
 Religious Scouts Sector
 Department of International Relations
 The Israel Scouts delegation to North America
 The Friendship Caravan
 The Poland Delegation
 International Programs in Israel
 Short Delegations
 Garin Tzabar
 Human Resources Department
 Operations and Procurement Department
 Israel Scouts Ranch
 Resource Development Department

Religious Scouts division 
"Adat HaTzofim" or "Religious Scouts" is a religious division of 12 Scout tribes in the Hebrew Scouts Movement in Israel. Shevet Masuot in Jerusalem is the largest and oldest tribe in this division. It was founded in 1945, and has operated continuously since then.

The purpose of the Religious Scouts is to allow all young Scouts to belong to the Scout Movement regardless of origin, political views, or spiritual views, while emphasizing the bridge between religious and secular youth. "Adat HaTzofim" educates and works with the same values of the Scouts movement, but also uses the teachings of the bible of Israel and the Jewish religion.

Israel Scouts Ranch 
The Israeli Scouts Ranch is a camping and outdoor education facility located in the Galilee region of Israel. It is owned and operated by the Hebrew Scouts movement, and serves as a hub for Scout activities and events in the country.

The Israeli Scouts Ranch covers a large area and includes a variety of facilities and amenities, including cabins, tents, a dining hall, and classrooms. The ranch is also home to a number of educational programs and activities, including wilderness survival skills, environmental education, and leadership development.

The Israeli Scouts Ranch is a popular destination for Scout groups from all over Israel, and is often used for Scout camps, training programs, and other Scout events. It is also open to the public for day use and rental for events and activities.

Overall, the Israeli Scouts Ranch is an important part of the Scout movement in Israel, providing a place for Scouts to learn new skills, develop leadership abilities, and experience the outdoors. It is a valuable resource for Scout groups from around the country.

Notable alumni

Politics and government 

 Benjamin Netanyahu
 Merav Michaeli
 Asaf Zamir
 Aryeh Eldad
 Ofer Berkovich
 Daniel Friedmann
 Yoav Galant
 Zvi Gendelman
 Ada Feinberg-Sireni
 Miki Haimovich
 Ronen Hoffman

Academia 

 Rachel Elior
 Ruth Gavison
 Idit Keidar

Music, literature and arts 

 Din Din Aviv
 Doron Medalie
 Gidi Gov
 Amos Oz
 Shlomo Artzi
 Galila Ron-Feder Amit
 Dudu Faruk
 Ayelet Zurer

Media 

 Tamar Ish-Shalom
 Moti Kirschenbaum
 Lucy Ayub

Military and security 

 Aviv Kochavi
 Herzi HaLevi
 Ghassan Alian
 Giora Romm

Business 

 Shimon Mizrachi

See also 
 Israel Boy and Girl Scouts Federation

References

External links
 The Hebrew Scouts Movement in Israel (Hebrew)
 Friends of Israel Scouts, Inc. – Tzofim

Scouting and Guiding in Israel
World Association of Girl Guides and Girl Scouts member organizations
World Organization of the Scout Movement member organizations
Jewish youth organizations
Zionist youth movements
Youth organizations established in 1919